Invasion percolation is a mathematical model of realistic fluid distributions for slow immiscible fluid invasion in porous media,  in percolation theory.
It "explicitly takes into account the transport process taking place". A wetting fluid such as water takes over from a non-wetting fluid such as oil, and capillary forces are taken into account. It was introduced by Wilkinson and Willemsen (1983).

References

Percolation theory
Fluid dynamics